The Rustic Road system is a system of Wisconsin scenic roads. They differ from the main trunkline highway system in that they are not meant to be major through routes, but lightly traveled local access, and are to meet minimum standards for natural features. Rustic roads have lower speed limits than those on other highway systems. Each route is marked by brown and yellow signs, with the route number on a small placard below the sign. The letter "R" prefix is followed by the number designation. Wisconsin is the only state to have a system of rustic roads. Wisconsin has a separate system of scenic byways following the development of a national system in the 1990s.

System description

The Rustic Road concept was conceived in 1973. The Wisconsin State Legislature established the program to help preserve lightly traveled scenic rural roads. There are a few requirements that a road must have in order to be designated as a rustic road, such as having outstanding natural features or areas that set the road apart from other roads, be a lightly traveled road, not be scheduled for a major improvement which would change its rustic characteristics, and preferably be at least  with a loop, completed closure, or connection to a major highway at both ends of the route. Rustic roads may be dirt, gravel, or paved. They can be one- or two-way and can have accommodations for bicycles and hiking adjacent to or incorporated into the road or surrounding area. The designation process is initiated by application for designation by a local government.

History
The effort to identify rustic roads began in order to help local government and citizens preserve Wisconsin's scenic routes. The Rustic Roads system was established by the 1973 Wisconsin State Legislature. The law created the Wisconsin Rustic Roads Board. The first road was designated in 1975 in Taylor County in the Town of Rib Lake. The application requires the reasons why a road should be designated, photographs, and a resolution of support from the local government. A 10-member volunteer board develops the rules and standards for the roads, and enacts the final approval for each designation. Before approving, two members of the board separately drive and personally assess the proposed route.

List

See also

References

External links

Rustic Roads at Wisconsin Highways
Rustic Roads at WisDOT
Current WisDOT guide to all Rustic Roads

State highways in Wisconsin